Georgia Cormick is an Australian rugby union player. She made her Wallaroos test debut in 2019. She plays for the Melbourne Rebels in the Super W competition and will play for Matatū in the Super Rugby Aupiki competition.

Biography 
Cormick was born in Dunedin and moved to Melbourne with her parents as a baby. She began her rugby career when she was eight and played until she was 12, she was forced to stop playing because her local league didn’t have a competition for girls.

Cormick was impressive during the inaugural Super W season in 2018 and claimed the Rebels’ Women’s Best Back award. She was completing her Masters Degree in Osteopathy and training for rugby simultaneously.

In 2019, She made her international debut for the Wallaroos against Japan. Later that year she was set to make her starting debut against the Black Ferns in the first test of a double header with the Wallabies and All Blacks.

Cormick will make her Super Rugby Aupiki debut for Matatū in the 2023 season. She also made her debut for Otago in the Farah Palmer Cup in 2022.

References 

1996 births
Living people
Australian female rugby union players
Australia women's international rugby union players